I Field Force, Vietnam was a corps-level command of the United States Army during the Vietnam War. Activated on 15 March 1966, it was the successor to Task Force Alpha, a provisional corps command created 1 August 1965 (renamed Field Force Vietnam on 25 September) for temporary control of activities of U.S. Army ground combat units arriving in Vietnam. I Field Force was a component of U.S. Military Assistance Command Vietnam (MACV) and had its headquarters at Nha Trang.

Area of Responsibility and Units Assigned 

I Field Force's area of responsibility was II Corps Tactical Zone, later renamed Military Region 2, which comprised the twelve provinces of Vietnam's Central Highlands. Among the divisions and brigades it controlled were:
1st Cavalry Division (Airmobile)
4th Infantry Division
3d Brigade, 25th Infantry Division
1st Brigade, 101st Airborne Division
173rd Airborne Brigade
41st Artillery Group
52nd Artillery Group
77th Radar Detachment
54th Signal Battalion

Inactivation 
I Field Force was inactivated on 30 April 1971 during the withdrawal of U.S. ground combat forces from Vietnam, and its assets formed the basis for its successor, the Second Regional Assistance Command (SRAC).

Commanders 
LTG Stanley R. Larsen March 1966 – July 1967
LTG William B. Rosson July 1967– February 1968
LTG William R. Peers March 1968 – March 1969
LTG Charles A. Corcoran March 1969 – March 1970
LTG Arthur S. Collins Jr. March 1970 – January 1971
MG Charles P. Brown January 1971 – April 1971

Notes

Sources 
 
 

Military units and formations of the United States Army in the Vietnam War
Corps of the United States Army
Military units and formations established in 1966
Military units and formations disestablished in 1971